Glória is a high-rise residential building in Bratislava district Ružinov, located on Záhradnícka street. The construction took 2 years and the building was finished in 2006. Glória has 29 floors and is 100 m high.

References

External links

Detailed information (in Slovak)

Buildings and structures in Bratislava
Buildings and structures completed in 2006